Bighton is a village and civil parish in the City of Winchester district of Hampshire, England. According to the 2011 census it had a population of 341, compared with 319 in 2001.

Notable residents
Victor Cannings (1919–2016), cricketer

References

External links

Villages in Hampshire